The 1999 World's Strongest Man was the 22nd edition of World's Strongest Man and was won by Jouko Ahola from Finland. It was his second title after finishing second the previous year. Janne Virtanen also from Finland finished second, and Svend Karlsen from Norway finished third. The contest was held on Malta.

Heats

Group 1

Events: Carry and Drag, Truck Pull, Loading, Hercules Hold, Log lift for reps, Medley

Group 2

Events: Carry and Drag, Husafell Stone, Atlas Stones, Lateral Hold, Dead Lift Hold, Medley

Group 3

Events: Carry and Drag, Husafell Stone, Loading, Hercules Hold, Log lift for reps, Medley

Group 4

Events: Carry and Drag, Truck Pull, Loading, Lateral Hold, Dead Lift Hold, Medley

Group 5

Events: Carry and Drag, Truck Pull, Atlas Stones, Hercules Hold, Dead Lift Hold, Medley

Final results

Events: Super Yoke, Dead lift for max, Boat Pull, Atlas Stones, Plane Pull, Giant log lift for reps, Medley

References

External links
 Official site

World's Strongest Man
1999 in Maltese sport